Carsten Ball and Brydan Klein were the defending champions but only Klein returned, partnering Andrew Whittington. Klein lost in the first round to Jeevan Nedunchezhiyan and Ramkumar Ramanathan.

Luke Saville and Jordan Thompson won the title after defeating Nicolaas Scholtz and Tucker Vorster 6–2, 7–5 in the final.

Seeds

Draw

References
 Main Draw
 Qualifying Draw

Kentucky Bank Tennis Championships - Men's Doubles